Minenhle Dlamini (born 7 July 1990), known as Minnie Dlamini, is a South African on-air personality, actress and model. In 2010 she was selected as the new presenter for the SABC 1 Friday live-music show Live Amp.

Early life and education
She was born to Jabulani and Queen Dlamini in Durban, KwaZulu-Natal Province of South Africa. She had her early education at Northlands Girls' High School before she proceeded to the University of Cape Town where she studied film, media, drama and economics[incomplete/excluded].

Personal life
On 8 July 2017, she married Quinton Jones in a traditional marriage which took place in Glenn Hills, Durban North; before, they went on to do the white wedding on 16 September with exclusive coverage rights sold to Multichoice for R6-million.

On 13 October, through Vuzu Amp on DStv, she debuted the first episode of Minnie Dlamini: Becoming Mrs Jones, a three-part reality docu-series which documents her pre-wedding and post-wedding journey. On 19 October, VuzuTV announced via Twitter, that the first episode of Minnie Dlamini: Becoming Mrs Jones became the highest rated show in Vuzu Amp history.

In early 2022, it was reported that Minenhle and Quinton filed for divorce after four years of marriage after it was rumoured that she had cheated with businessman Edwin Sodi.

Career

On-air personality
While studying at the University of Cape Town, Dlamini was a presenter for LIVE on 16 June 2010, after she made her debut screen appearance while covering the "Youth Day" and "World Cup celebrations" shows. She later co-hosted Mzansi Insider, an SABC 1's lifestyle show. In 2012, she resigned from the show in order to pursue a career in acting. In 2013, Minnie switched to sports broadcasting by co-hosting Soccerzone with Thomas Mlambo, until in 2016 when the show's format was changed by SABC 1. She has since co-hosted several local and international award ceremonies, including the 14th Metro FM Music Awards, 2016 Africa Magic Viewers Choice Awards, the PSL Awards and the South African Film and Television Awards.

Acting
In 2010, Dlamini debuted as a film actress in Generations, a SABC 1 TV soap in which she made a guest appearance as Miranda. She went on to play a lead role as Zintle Lebone in the soap The Wild and as Nosipho Bogatsu in Rockville.

Modelling
In September 2011, Dlamini was announced as the new face of South African departmental store LEGit, with her own fashion range, the Minnie-Series.

Filmography

Philanthropy
In 2014, Dlamini founded the Minnie Dlamini Foundation, a charity organization established with the aim of helping young South African girls have access to good education. On 15 July 2015, she announced via Twitter that her foundation will be sponsoring 29 students with their university fees.

References

External links
 
 

1990 births
Living people
South African female models
South African actresses
South African television presenters
University of Cape Town alumni
South African women television presenters